The 2011 Major League Baseball wild card chase was a playoff chase involving the Atlanta Braves and St. Louis Cardinals in the National League and the Boston Red Sox and Tampa Bay Rays in the American League.

On the last day of the 2011 regular season, the postseason fate of these four teams fighting for two playoff spots across both leagues was decided. In the National League, the St. Louis Cardinals defeated the Houston Astros to win the National League wild card berth after the Atlanta Braves lost to the Philadelphia Phillies. In the American League, the Tampa Bay Rays defeated their American League East division rivals the New York Yankees with dramatic home runs in the 9th inning by Dan Johnson and later in extra innings by Evan Longoria to win the American League wild card berth after the Baltimore Orioles defeated the Boston Red Sox on a walk-off single.

On September 2, the Red Sox and Braves had led the American League and National League wild card races by 9 and  games, respectively. In their final 25 games, the Red Sox went 7–18 while the Braves went 8–17; in the same timespan, the Rays and Cardinals each won 17 games to secure the wild cards. The Red Sox and Braves became the first teams in history to hold leads as large as eight games in September and miss the postseason. The Cardinals eventually rode the momentum of their win to win the NLDS and NLCS on their way to defeating the Texas Rangers for their 11th World Series title.

The 2011 season was the final season of the single wild card format, as MLB added second wild card teams to each league starting with the 2012 season.

American League Wild Card race

Boston Red Sox at Baltimore Orioles
Wednesday, September 28, 2011 – 7:05 pm (EDT) at Oriole Park at Camden Yards in Baltimore, Maryland

The Red Sox were favored by pundits to win the American League pennant prior to the start of the season due to acquisitions of Adrián González, Carl Crawford and Bobby Jenks. Despite a slow start, Boston darted to the top of the division during the summer months. Injuries plagued the team and they slowly lost first place to the Yankees, but were still in comfortable contention for the wild card. The month of September started an epic slump for the team where the team had allowed the Rays to get back into contention. However, Boston still controlled its own destiny going into their final series with the last place Orioles, but wound up having the season come down to the last game.

The Red Sox had taken a lead for a good part of the game, but the Orioles mounted a comeback. The game was interrupted by a rain delay in the middle of the 7th with Boston ahead 3–2. After play had resumed almost an hour and a half later, the Orioles still trailed by a run in the bottom of the 9th. When leading after eight innings, the Red Sox were 77–0 in 2011. Facing closer Jonathan Papelbon, Chris Davis and Nolan Reimold hit back-to-back doubles with two outs, which tied the game. The next batter, Robert Andino, hit a line drive to left field which Carl Crawford was unable to catch, allowing Reimold to score and the Orioles walked off with the win.

After the Orioles won, Andino, who had been a Red Sox killer of late, said, "End of season like this, to make Boston go home sad, crying, I'll take it all day."

New York Yankees at Tampa Bay Rays
Wednesday, September 28, 2011 – 7:10 pm (EDT) at Tropicana Field in St. Petersburg, Florida

The Yankees had already won the American League East several days prior to this contest. The Rays had been in third place behind both the Yankees and the Red Sox for much of the season. However, Boston had slowly started to lose many games in September due to poor starting and relief pitching, disappointing hitting from newly acquired free agent Carl Crawford throughout the year, and injuries to key players like Kevin Youkilis. The Rays, who had won the division in 2010, had lost many of their players to free agency. Despite the losses, the Rays had crawled back into contention and faced the Yankees in the final series of the year.

Yankees manager Joe Girardi indicated that he would approach the final games so that the team's pitching staff would be set up for the 2011 ALDS against the Detroit Tigers. Suspicions rose to whether or not the Yankees would compete intensely due to them wanting to rest their aging players for the playoffs and to keep the Red Sox out, their fierce rivals whom they had a lopsided losing record to that season. Girardi indicated that many of his post-season pitchers would not be pitching that game. The Yankees, however, started the game strong by taking a 5–0 lead by the 2nd inning. Their lead grew to 7–0, which they held as the game entered the bottom of the 8th inning. In the 8th inning, the Rays scored six runs, capped off by a three-run home run by Evan Longoria. In the bottom of the 9th inning, down to his final strike, struggling Rays first baseman Dan Johnson hit a solo home run to tie the game. Already depleted from wanting to get pitchers who were not going to be on the postseason roster in, the Yankees went into extra innings with struggling pitchers. During Tampa Bay's half of the 12th inning, Evan Longoria hit his second home run of the game, a walk-off home run that cleared a short wall near the left field foul pole to win the game for the Rays just minutes after the Orioles' victory over the Red Sox. The win clinched the American League Wild Card for the Rays.

Seat No. 10 in the first row behind the right-field foul pole has been painted white in honor of Dan Johnson's, game-tying, ninth-inning, pinch-hit blast during Game 162.  They have also renamed the section beyond the left field foul pole "162 Landing" in honor of Longoria's game winning, 12th-inning home run.

National League Wild Card race
The National League wild-card race came down to the fate of two games on the last day of the regular season.

St. Louis Cardinals at Houston Astros
Wednesday, September 28, 2011 – 7:05 pm (CDT) at Minute Maid Park in Houston, Texas

The National League Central had been a two-way race late into the season with the Cardinals and Milwaukee Brewers vying for contention. After the Reds had fallen off, the Brewers had clinched the division. The Cardinals battled back despite perennial all-star Albert Pujols serving on the disabled list and not having pitcher Adam Wainwright. Upon Pujols' return, the Cardinals came within one game by defeating the Astros under nine innings of dominant pitching by ace pitcher Chris Carpenter.

Philadelphia Phillies at Atlanta Braves
Wednesday, September 28, 2011 – 7:10 pm (EDT) at Turner Field in Atlanta, Georgia

The Philadelphia Phillies had clinched a playoff berth, the division title, and the best league record for weeks. For most of the season, the Atlanta Braves had been in 2nd place in the National League East by a good margin and well ahead in the wildcard standings. The Phillies had something to play for, a franchise record in wins. They battled back to force the game into extra innings where they won and in effect, not only eliminated the Braves from post-season contention, but also set that record with 102, surpassing the previous record of 101 set back-to-back in 1976 and 1977 during their run of three straight division championships from 1976 to 1978. Charlie Manuel also became the manager with most wins in the history of the Phillies with 646 wins, surpassing Gene Mauch, the manager of the Phillies when they collapsed in a similar way the Braves did in 1964.

Aftermath
The Rays would go on to lose the Division Series in four games to the Texas Rangers, winning only Game 1.

The Cardinals would go on to win the World Series, overcoming a 2–1 deficit in the Division Series and twice coming back from being a strike away from losing the 2011 World Series in Game 6, which was won on a walk-off home run by David Freese.

References

2011 Major League Baseball season 
Atlanta Braves
Boston Red Sox
St. Louis Cardinals
Tampa Bay Rays
Historic baseball plays